Haman Hu, also known as Hua Shao, is a Chinese television host. He is known for being the host of The Voice of China. and Sing! China

Career
He was born in Hangzhou in 1981. He had autism in his childhood, which was attributed to growing up with a single parent. He went to Zhejiang Broadcasting University (浙江广播电视大学).

Hu went to Hangzhou People's Radio Station in 1999 and then he went to Zhejiang Television. He has been married and he has a son who is named "Mi Le", and his wife, Qin Lige is a TV director with Zhejiang Television.

He is known by Chinese as the fastest host in China.

Hosting
The Voice of China
Chinese Dream Show
Do You Remember
Ai Chang Cai Hui Ying (Sing to Win)
Sound Of My Dream
Chase Me

Filmography
 Coward Hero (2019)
 Lost in Love (2019)
 You Are My Sunshine (2015)
 I Love You, Too. (2015)
 All You Need Is Love (2015)

References

External links

1981 births
Living people
Chinese television presenters
Male actors from Hangzhou